The Mickey Thompson Entertainment Group (MTEG) was a sanctioning body for an American short course off-road racing series that took place inside stadiums. Some events were televised, including on TNN and ESPN.

History
Mickey Thompson raced desert trucks in the SCORE International series. Thompson said that he was seen "by nothing but cactus and jackrabbits." He reasoned that he needed to bring the excitement of desert racing to a wider audience.

The body and series were established by Thompson in 1979. The first event was held in the Los Angeles Coliseum. The body also sanctioned motorcycle races called Supercross. The stadium series survived Thompson's 1988 murder. The body went bankrupt in 1996. The concept of stadium off-road racing was revived with the creation of the Stadium Super Trucks in 2013 by former series champion Robby Gordon.

Vehicle classes
 Grand National Sport Trucks
 Super 1600s
 Sport Utility Vehicles (also known as Ultrastock)
 Superlites
 Ultracross
 All Terrain Vehicles

Grand National Sport Trucks champions
 1983 – Ivan Stewart
 1984 – Ivan Stewart
 1985 – Roger Mears
 1986 – Steve Millen
 1987 – Jeff Huber
 1988 – Steve Millen
 1989 – Robby Gordon
 1990 – Ivan Stewart
 1991 – Walker Evans
 1992 – Rod Millen
 1993 – Rod Millen
 1994 – Rod Millen

Other notable drivers
 Evan Evans – stadium series
 Jimmie Johnson – stadium series
 Rob MacCachren – stadium series
 Casey Mears – stadium series
 Jerry Whelchel – winningest driver in stadium series history

References

External links
 History
 Bankruptcy documents

Auto racing organizations in the United States
Off-road racing series